"Emma's House" is the debut single by the Field Mice.  It was released as a 7" vinyl record on Sarah Records in November 1988. It reached number 20 on the UK Independent Chart in December that year.

The title track was included in Pitchfork 500 : Our Guide to the Greatest Songs from Punk to the Present.

Track listing
7" Single (SARAH 012)
"Emma's House" – 3:36
"When You Sleep" – 3:31
 "Fabulous Friend" – 2:52
 "The Last Letter" – 2:43

References

Sarah Records singles
1988 singles
The Field Mice songs
1988 songs
Song articles with missing songwriters